Whittington is a civil parish in Lancaster, Lancashire, England. It contains 39 buildings that are recorded in the National Heritage List for England as designated listed buildings.  Of these, three are at Grade II*, the middle grade, and the others are at Grade II, the lowest grade.  The parish contains the villages of Whittington, Docker and Newton, and is otherwise rural.  Most of the listed buildings are country houses with associated structures, smaller houses, and farm buildings.  The other listed buildings include a church with a sundial in the churchyard, buildings on a  model farm, three milestones, a boundary stone, and a former school.

Key

Buildings

Notes and references

Notes

Citations

Sources

Lists of listed buildings in Lancashire
Buildings and structures in the City of Lancaster